The Peacock Inn is a historic restaurant and inn in Princeton, New Jersey.  The building itself dates to the 18th century and was originally located at the corner of Nassau Street and University Place. During the American Revolution it was the home of Jonathan Deare, and played host to members of the Continental Congress when they met in nearby Nassau Hall.  It was moved to its current location in 1875 by famed archaeologist and Olympic athlete William Libbey.  Joseph and Helen O'Conner purchased the property in 1911 and opened the Peacock Inn, naming it after an inn in Derbyshire, England.  The Inn has 16 guest rooms but is most known for its restaurant, consistently rated one of the finest in the state.

References

External links
Official website

Buildings and structures in Princeton, New Jersey
Restaurants in New Jersey
Hotels in New Jersey
Restaurants on the National Register of Historic Places
Hotel buildings on the National Register of Historic Places in New Jersey